KLUJ-TV (channel 44) is a religious television station licensed to Harlingen, Texas, United States, serving the Lower Rio Grande Valley with programming from the Trinity Broadcasting Network (TBN). It is owned and operated by TBN's Community Educational Television subsidiary, which manages stations in Texas and Florida on channels allocated for non-commercial educational broadcasting. KLUJ-TV's studios are located on Loop 499 in Harlingen, and its transmitter is located near Palm Valley, Texas.

History 
The station signed on the air on June 25, 1984 as the Lower Rio Grande Valley's first general-entertainment independent station before switching to TBN in 1986.

Subchannels

External links 
KLUJ-TV information on TBN's website

Trinity Broadcasting Network affiliates
Television channels and stations established in 1984
Harlingen, Texas
Television stations in the Lower Rio Grande Valley
1984 establishments in Texas